Pseudochalcothea virens is a species of beetles of the family Scarabaeidae and subfamily Cetoniinae.

Description
Upper surface is completely green and the antennae and palpi are brown.

Distribution
This species occurs in Sumatra.

References
, 1993. Note on the Genus Pseudochalcothea  (Coleoptera, Scarabaeidae, Cetoniinae) from Borneo. Gekkan-Mushi (269): 4–11.
Hermann Schlegel  Notes from the Royal Zoological Museum of the Netherlands at Leyden
 Zipcodezoo Species Identifier
 Pseudochalcothea virens

Cetoniinae
Beetles described in 1879